Chinor is a village and jamoat in western Tajikistan. It is part of the city of Panjakent in Sughd Region. The jamoat has a total population of 6,879 (2015). It consists of 5 villages, including Nuriston (the seat), Chinor and Sharshara.

References

Populated places in Sughd Region
Jamoats of Tajikistan